Light Cavalry is a 1935 German musical film directed by Werner Hochbaum and starring Marika Rökk, Heinz von Cleve, and Fritz Kampers. A separate French-language version Light Cavalry was also released with Mona Goya in the starring role.

The film's sets were designed by the art directors  and Erich Czerwonski.

Plot 
The film begins with scenes related to the Cherubini circus. In the evenings, the circus people go to a nearby inn that belongs to Rosika's stepfather. She doesn't want to be there for the guests and dance for them, so she leaves the house and seeks shelter with Rux, the circus clown.

Rux has developed a revue act for the circus, which revolves around a solo dancer and rider. The director Cherubini likes that, and there is also a female main character: Rosika. She can dance, but still has to learn to ride. While working with the horses, she meets Geza, who has just been hired as a stable boy. He is courting her, so Rux has to fear losing her for his big circus act. So he gets Geza under a pretext to leave the circus. He makes his way to his brother, and we learn that they are the Hungarian nobles from Raskos. But now Cherubini has fallen in love with Rosika. But when she rejects him, he throws Rux and Rosika out.

The two artists try in vain to get a place with another circus with their new revue number "Leichte Kavallerie". Finally they get an engagement in Budapest. Cherubini and the employees of his circus appear at the premiere, Geza also appears. After the first big performance, Rux talks to Geza and admits that he downplayed Rosika's affection for him at the time so as not to lose her for his program.

A second large dance scene follows, which ends with thunderous applause. Geza rushes to Rosika, there is a happy ending.

Cast

References

Bibliography

External links 
 

1935 films
Films of Nazi Germany
German musical films
1935 musical films
Operetta films
1930s German-language films
Films directed by Werner Hochbaum
UFA GmbH films
Films set in Italy
Films set in Hungary
Circus films
German multilingual films
German black-and-white films
1935 multilingual films
1930s German films